Ans or ANS or variation, may refer to:

Places
 Ans, Belgium, a municipality in Belgium
 Ans, Denmark, a village in Denmark
 Angus, Scotland, UK; a council area by its Chapman code
 Ainsdale railway station, England, UK (by station code ANS)
 Andahuaylas Airport, Peru (by IATA airport code ANS)

People
 Ans (given name), a Dutch feminine given name
 Anna Nicole Smith, American model and actress

Organizations 
 Academy of Natural Sciences of Philadelphia, Pennsylvania, United States
 Astronomical Netherlands Satellite, a Dutch satellite
 American Name Society
 American Nuclear Society
 American Numismatic Society, formerly the American Numismatic and Archaeological Society
 ANS Group of Companies, a news organization in Azerbaijan
 , a Cambodian resistance group; see Coalition Government of Democratic Kampuchea
 Audubon Naturalist Society, an American environmental organization

Chemistry and biology 
 Adrenergic nervous system, adrenaline and noradrenaline neurotransmitters distribution in human body
 8-Anilino-1-naphthalenesulfonic acid, a fluorescent chemical compound used as a molecular probe
 Anthocyanidin synthase, an enzyme in the leucocyanidin biosynthesis pathway
 Approximate number system, a hypothesized physiological basis for the sense of number
 Autonomic nervous system, part of the peripheral nervous system in the body

Technology
 , an unofficial file extension for ANSI art
 Advanced Network and Services, a non-profit network service provider in the 1990s
 American National Standards, defined by the American National Standards Institute
 ans, a variable in MATLAB, created automatically when no output argument is specified, referring to the most recent answer
 ANS carriage control characters (or ASA control characters), for computer line printers
 Asymmetric numeral systems, coding in data compression
 Authoritative name server, a DNS server
 Artificial neural system, or Artificial neural network
 Air Navigation Services, as delivered by an Air Navigation Service Provider (ANSP)

Music
 ANS (album), a box set from the British band Coil
 ANS synthesizer, a Russian photoelectric musical instrument

Other uses
 Al Ansar FC, a Lebanese association football club
 Amman National School, in Amman, Jordan
 Ansvarlig selskap, a Norwegian personal responsibility company model
 Algemeen Nijmeegs Studentenblad, a Dutch student magazine

See also

 
 
 
 AN (disambiguation)
 Answer (disambiguation), for which "Ans." may be an abbreviation